Franklin Bryant Washburn III (April 28, 1889 – April 30, 1963) was an American film actor who appeared in more than 370 films between 1911 and 1947. Washburn's parents were Franklin Bryant Washburn II and Metha Catherine Johnson Washburn. He attended Lake View High School in Chicago.

Washburn's early acting experience came in stock theater. He debuted in film in 1911 with Essanay Studios. He quickly became a comedy star after appearing in films such as Skinner's Baby and Skinner's Dress Suit in 1917.

His second marriage was to actress Virginia Vance. They had a child together.

He died from a heart attack in Hollywood. His interment was located in Culver City, California's Holy Cross Cemetery. His son, Bryant Washburn, Jr. (1915–1960), was also an actor, a major in the US Air Force Reserve, served during World War II and Korea, and predeceased him.

Selected filmography 

 The Dark Romance of a Tobacco Tin (1911, short) as Telegraph Clerk
 Saved from the Torrents (1911, short) as Jack Carrington as Katie's Brother
 A False Suspicion (1911, short) as Richard Lee
 He Fought for the U.S.A. (1911, short) as Bob Langdon as Second Brother
 The Madman (1911, short) as Balloonist (uncredited)
 The Mail Order Wife (1912) as John White
 Alias Billy Sargent (1912, short) as Hotel Clerk
 When Soul Meets Soul (1913, short)
 The Spy's Defeat (1913, short)
 The Power of Conscience (1913, short) as Byron Waters
 One Wonderful Night (1914) as Howard Devar, Curtis' Friend
 Graustark (1915) as Prince Lorenz
 The Slim Princess (1915) as Rawley Plumston
 The Blindness of Virtue (1915) as Archibald Graham
 The Sky Hunters (1915) as Steve Jackson
 The Crimson Wing (1915) as Lt. von Arnheim
 The Alster Case (1915) as George Swan
 The Havoc (1916) as Paul Hessert
 The Prince of Graustark (1916) as Prince Robin of Graustark
 The Breaker (1916) as John Widder
 Marriage a la Carte (1916)
 Skinner's Dress Suit (1917) as William Manning Skinner
 Skinner's Bubble (1917) as William Manning Skinner
 Filling His Own Shoes (1917) as William Ruggles
 The Man Who Was Afraid (1917) as Benton Clune
 The Golden Idiot (1917) as Barry Owen
 Skinner's Baby (1917) as William Manning Skinner
 The Fibbers (1917) as Peter Cort
 The Voice of Conscience (1917) as Minor Role
 Twenty-One (1918) as Jimmy Mufferton / 'Battling' Dave Carey
 Kidder & Ko (1918) as Cuthbert Kidder
 The Ghost of the Rancho (1918) as Jeffrey Wall
 Till I Come Back to You (1918) as Capt. Jefferson Strong
 The Gypsy Trail (1918) as Edward Andrews
 The Way of a Man with a Maid (1918) as Arthur McArney
 Venus in the East (1919) as Buddy McNair
 The Poor Boob (1919) as Simpson Hightower
 Something to Do (1919) as Jack Merrill
 Putting It Over (1919) as Robert 'Buddy' Marsh
 All Wrong (1919) as Warren Kent
 A Very Good Young Man (1919) as LeRoy Sylvester
 Love Insurance (1919) as Dick Minot
 Why Smith Left Home (1919) as John Brown Smith
 It Pays to Advertise (1919) as Rodney Martin
 Too Much Johnson (1919) as Augustus Billings
 The Six Best Cellars (1920) as Henry Carpenter
 Mrs. Temple's Telegram (1920) as Jack Temple
 The Sins of St. Anthony (1920) as Anthony Osgood
 What Happened to Jones (1920) as Jimmie Jones
 A Full House (1920) as George Howell
 Burglar Proof (1920) as John Harlow
 An Amateur Devil (1920) as Carver Endicott
 The Road to London (1921) as Rex Rowland
 June Madness (1922) as Ken Pauling
 White Shoulders (1922) as Cole Hawkins
 Hungry Hearts (1922) as David
 The Woman Conquers (1922) as Frederick Van Court, III
 Night Life in Hollywood (1922) as himself
 Temptation (1923) as Jack Baldwin
 Mary of the Movies (1923) as himself (uncredited)
 Rupert of Hentzau (1923) as Count Fritz
 Hollywood (1923, lost film) as himself
 Mine to Keep (1923) as Victor Olney
 The Common Law (1923) as John Buleson
The Love Trap (1923) as Martin Antrim
 The Meanest Man in the World (1923) as Ned Stevens
 Other Men's Daughters (1923) as Alaska Kid
 Try and Get It (1924) as Joseph Merrill
 Hello, 'Frisco (1924) as himself
 My Husband's Wives (1924) as William Harvey
 The Star Dust Trail (1924) as John Warding
 The Parasite (1925) as Doctor Brooks
 Wizard of Oz (1925) as Prince Kynd
 Passionate Youth (1925) as Corbin
 Wandering Footsteps (1925) as Hal Whitney
 Wet Paint (1926) as Her brother
 Meet the Prince (1926)
 Her Sacrifice (1926) as Donald Gorham
 Young April (1926) as Prince Michael
 Flames (1926) as Hilary Fenton
 The Love Thrill (1927) J. Anthony Creelman
 Beware of Widows (1927)
 The King of Kings (1927) as Young Roman
 Black Tears (1927)
 Sitting Bull at the Spirit Lake Massacre (1927) as Donald Keefe
 Breakfast at Sunrise (1927) as Marquis
 In the First Degree (1927) as Philip Stanwood
 The Chorus Kid (1928) as John Powell
 Modern Daughters (1927)
 Jazzland (1928)
 A Bit of Heaven (1928)
 Honeymoon Flats (1928) as Tom Twitchell
 Nothing to Wear (1928) as Tommy Butler
 Swing High (1930)
 Kept Husbands (1931) as Charles Bates
 Crashing Hollywood (1931)
 Stout Hearts and Willing Hands (1931)
 The Lure of Hollywood (1931)
 The Mystery Train (1931) as William Mortimer
 Thrill of Youth (1932) as Colby Sherwood
 The Arm of the Law (1932) as John Welling
 Drifting Souls (1932) as Littlefield
 What Price Hollywood? (1932) as Washed-Up Star (uncredited)
 Night of Terror (1933) as John Rinehart
 Devil's Mate (1933) as District Attorney
 The Woman Who Dared (1933)
 Cleopatra (1934) as Undetermined Role (uncredited)
 Tailspin Tommy (1934, Serial) as Mr. Grant, director of Midnight Patrol
 The Call of the Savage (1935) as Dr. Harry Trevor
 Swellhead (1935) as Malone
 The Drunkard (1935) as Mr. Karnes
 Danger Ahead (1935) as Nick Conrad
 The Throwback (1935) as Jack Thorne
 Tailspin Tommy in the Great Air Mystery (1935) as Ned Curtis, Betty's uncle and a heroic oil tycoon
 Taming the Wild (1936) as Bert Graham
 The Preview Murder Mystery (1936) as Carl Jennings
 The Millionaire Kid (1936) as Terry Malone
 It Couldn't Have Happened – But It Did (1936) as Norman Carter
 Gambling with Souls (1936) as 'Million Dollar' Taylor
 Wanted! Jane Turner (1936) as Magee
 Conflict (1936) as City Editor
 The Toast of New York (1937) as Vanderbilt's Broker (uncredited)
 Sky Patrol (1939) as Brainbridge
 Abe Lincoln in Illinois (1940) as Minor Role (uncredited)
 King of the Royal Mounted (1940, Serial) as Matt Crandall
 Adventures of Captain Marvel (1941, Serial) as Harry Carlyle
 The Spider Returns (1941) as Westfall
 Paper Bullets (1941) as Attorney Bruce King
 Shadows on the Sage (1942) as Banker John Carson
 Sin Town (1942) as Anderson
 War Dogs (1942) as Col. Mason
 Carson City Cyclone (1943) as Doctor Andrews
 The Law Rides Again (1943) as Commissioner Lee
 The Girl from Monterrey (1943) as Fight Commissioner Bogart
 Nabonga (1944) as White Hunter
 Follow the Leader (1944) as Colonel
 The Falcon in Mexico (1944) as Humphrey Wade, artist
 West of the Pecos (1945) as Doc Howard

References

External links 

 
 

1889 births
1963 deaths
20th-century American male actors
American male film actors
American male silent film actors
Burials at Holy Cross Cemetery, Culver City
Male actors from Chicago